Portable Contacts was an open protocol for developers to make it easier for developers to give their users a secure way to access the address books and friends lists they have built up all over the web. The goal of the project was to increase data portability by creating a common and open specification to bridge proprietary contacts Application programming interfaces (API) such as Google's GData Contacts API, Yahoo's Address Book API, and Microsoft's Live Contacts API. It combines OAuth, XRDS-Simple and a wire-format based on vCard harmonized with schema from OpenSocial.

The editor of Portable Contacts specification was Joseph Smarr of Plaxo and the project co-maintained by Chris Messina.

Portable Contacts was used by services such as Google Contacts, Windows Live Messenger Connect, as well as other specification such as OStatus.

References

External links
 homepage of Portable Contacts (archive, original site died, later cloned by a spammer)
 Portable Contacts 1.0 specification (archive)

Application programming interfaces
Business cards